Romanovsky (masculine), Romanovskaya (feminine) is a Russian surname.
Other Slavic equivalents: Romanowski (Polish),  Ramanauskas (Lithuanian), Ramanouski/Ramanouskaya (Belarusian), Romanovskyy/Romanovska (Ukrainian). All are toponymic surnames derived from any of locations named Romanów, Romany, or Romanowo,  the latter names literally meaning "belonging to Roman."

Notable people with the surname include:

Russian
Alexander Romanovsky (chess player) (1880–1943), Lithuanian–Russian chess master
Alexander Romanovsky (pianist) (born 1984), Ukrainian classical pianist
Elena Romanovskaya, Russian ice dancer
Ivan Romanovsky (1877–1920), general in the Imperial Russian Army and White movement
Princess Natalia Romanovskaya-Iskander (1917–1999), daughter of Prince Romanovsky-Iskander, son of Grand Duke Nicholas Constantinovich of Russia
Paul Ilyinsky (Paul Romanovsky-Ilyinsky), 1928–2004), former mayor of Palm Beach, Florida and a son of Grand Duke Dmitry Pavlovich of Russia
Peter Romanovsky (1892–1964), chess player
Vladimir Zakharovich Romanovsky (1896-1967), Soviet general
Vladimir Romanovsky (1957–2013), Soviet sprint canoeist
Vsevolod Ivanovich Romanovsky (1879–1954), Russian-Soviet-Uzbek mathematician

Belarusian
Aliaksandra Ramanouskaya (born 1996), Belarusian freestyle skier.

Ukrainian
Olga Romanovska, Ukrainian singer and model

See also

References

Russian-language surnames
East Slavic-language surnames